The Belarus men's national volleyball team represented Belarus in international volleyball competitions and friendly matches. The team is currently ranked 50 in the world. 

In light of the 2022 Russian invasion of Ukraine, the European Volleyball Confederation (CEV) banned all Belarusian national teams, clubs, and officials from participating in European competition, and suspended all members of Belarus from their respective functions in CEV organs.

Results

Challenger Cup
 Champions   Runners up   Third place   Fourth place

European Championship
 Champions   Runners up   Third place   Fourth place

European League
 Champions   Runners up   Third place   Fourth place

References

External links
 Official website

National sports teams of Belarus
National men's volleyball teams
Volleyball in Belarus